Rugby League in the United States has crowned champions of its national championship since 1997.

The sport has gone through two separate competitions starting with the American National Rugby League (AMNRL) premiership from 1997 to 2014 with the Ferrainola Cup and the USA Rugby League has crowned national champions since 2014.

Champions of the American National Rugby League (AMNRL) 
The Ferrainola Cup was awarded to the winner of the AMNRL Grand Final and given the title of National Champion..

The regular season title or Minor premiership was not awarded until the 2006 season.

By 2011, Seven teams that had previously competed in the American National Rugby League, the United States' established rugby league organization and recognized governing body for the sport, announced they were breaking with the AMNRL to form a new league. The stated reason for the split was dissatisfaction with the governance of the AMNRL; the departing teams were unhappy with the lack of club involvement in the league's decision making, and the new league was founded with the principle of including its member clubs in its administration, thus creating the USA Rugby League after the 2011 season.

USA Rugby League Champions  
In 2014, the United States Association of Rugby League became to undisputed top-level national after the American National Rugby League folded and the Rugby League European Federation and the Rugby League International Federation gave the USA Rugby League member status. The league began its rivalry with the former by beginning its inaugural in 2011.

For the first three seasons, the USA Rugby League was a single-division competition. In 2014, the teams were split into two conferences and three divisions.

Overall Championship Title Count 

The clubs in italics are no longer active in the league.

External links 
USA Rugby League Competition History 

Champions
United States champions